Son of the Golden West is a 1928 American silent Western film directed by Eugene Forde and starring Tom Mix, Sharon Lynn and Thomas G. Lingham.

Cast
 Tom Mix as Tom Hardy  
 Tony the Horse as Tony, Tom's Horse  
 Sharon Lynn as Alice Calhoun  
 Thomas G. Lingham as Jim Calhoun  
 Duke R. Lee as Slade  
 Lee Shumway as Tennessee  
 Fritzi Ridgeway as Rita  
 Joey Ray as Keller  
 Mark Hamilton as Kane  
 Wynn Mace as Slade's Henchman

References

Bibliography
 Jensen, Richard D. The Amazing Tom Mix: The Most Famous Cowboy of the Movies. 2005.

External links

 
 

1928 Western (genre) films
Films directed by Eugene Forde
1928 films
American black-and-white films
Film Booking Offices of America films
Silent American Western (genre) films
1920s English-language films
1920s American films